Persikotas Kota Tasikmalaya (or Persatuan Sepakbola Indonesia Kota Tasikmalaya) is an Indonesian football club based in Tasikmalaya, West Java. They currently compete in the Liga 3.

References

Tasikmalaya
Football clubs in Indonesia
Football clubs in West Java
Association football clubs established in 2002
2002 establishments in Indonesia